Carl Kareem Smith (born 18 January 1985), known as Kareem Smith, is an American-born Trinidadian footballer who plays as a centre back for Colorado Springs Switchbacks in the USL Professional Division and for the Trinidad and Tobago national football team. Previously, he was playing in the TT Pro League for San Juan Jabloteh F.C. Prior to playing in Trinidad & Tobago, he played for Formuladeildin side KÍ Klaksvík as well as in the MLS Reserve League for New England Revolution reserves side. He is represented by Pan American Calcio. He currently coaches for the Junior Varsity Team in Norwood, Massachusetts.

Career

Youth and college
In his youth, Smith was a member of the United States U18, the Region I Olympic Development Program (ODP) team and helped lead his club team, the South Shore United Blazers, to a U-15 Region I title and three Massachusetts state championships at each of the U-16 through U-18 levels. Smith played high school soccer for Beaver Country Day school and in NCAA for the South Florida Bulls where he started at centre-back with Neven Subotic and later with Yohance Marshall.

Smith completed his college eligibility in 2006 after collecting Second Team All-BIG EAST accolades. Smith, who played and started in every match during his four-year USF career, helped anchor a defense which recorded a 0.80 GAA (ranking 25th in the nation). The Hyde Park, Mass., native earned BIG EAST Defensive Player of the Week honors (Sept. 4) for a strong defensive outing versus a pair of ACC foes (N.C. State and Duke). Smith holds the USF record for consecutive starts (75) and is tied for the school mark in career matches (75).

Club career
On October 21, 2014, Smith signed a 2-year contract with USL Professional Division side, Colorado Springs Switchbacks.

International career
Smith represented the United States at the U-17 and U-18 level. He later switched to the Trinidad & Tobago U-20 Men's National Team and in January 2008, made his debut for the Trinidad and Tobago national football team against Guyana.
He is attempting to re-join the national team in hopes of entering the World Cup.

Personal life
Smith is Trinidadian through his father. He has served as high school assistant coach for Beaver Country Day school, one of the top prep high school soccer teams in the country. He is also in the hall of fame at Beaver Country Day School due to his outstanding soccer career (when he attended Beaver Country Day School).

References

1985 births
Living people
Soccer players from Boston
Citizens of Trinidad and Tobago through descent
Trinidad and Tobago footballers
Association football defenders
Trinidad and Tobago international footballers
South Florida Bulls men's soccer players
Cape Cod Crusaders players
Rochester New York FC players
KÍ Klaksvík players
United Petrotrin F.C. players
FC Tucson players
San Juan Jabloteh F.C. players
Colorado Springs Switchbacks FC players
TT Pro League players
USL League Two players
USL Championship players
American soccer players
United States men's youth international soccer players
American sportspeople of Trinidad and Tobago descent